The District Football Associations are the local governing bodies of association football in Norway. District FAs exist to govern all aspects of local football in their defined areas, providing grassroots support to the Norwegian Football Federation by promoting and administering football, futsal and beach soccer in their respective districts.

Most of the 18 District FAs align roughly with the boundaries of the historic and current Districts of Norway.

The District FAs administer youth football and the lower tier leagues from the Fourth Division (men) and the Second Division (women), respectively, and further below.

The 18 district organisations are as follows:

 Agder Fotballkrets
 Akershus Fotballkrets
 Buskerud Fotballkrets
 Finnmark Fotballkrets
 Hålogaland Fotballkrets
 Hordaland Fotballkrets
 Indre Østland Fotballkrets
 Nordland Fotballkrets
 Nordmøre og Romsdal Fotballkrets
 Oslo Fotballkrets
 Østfold Fotballkrets
 Rogaland Fotballkrets
 Sogn og Fjordane Fotballkrets
 Sunnmøre Fotballkrets
 Telemark Fotballkrets
 Troms Fotballkrets
 Trøndelag Fotballkrets
 Vestfold Fotballkrets

Footnotes

External links 
Norwegian Football Federation (official website)

 
Football governing bodies in Norway
Norway
Districts of Norway